Ripač is a village in the municipality of Bihać, Bosnia and Herzegovina.

Ripač is the location of a border crossing with Croatia, across Užljebić.

Demographics 
According to the 2013 census, its population was 1,316.

See also
Illyrian amber figures

References

Populated places in Bihać
Bosnia and Herzegovina–Croatia border crossings